The German DRG Class 02 (Baureihe 02 or BR 02) engines were standard (Einheitslokomotiven) express train locomotives with the Deutsche Reichsbahn-Gesellschaft. Number 02 001 was the first Einheitsdampflokomotive in the DRG to be completed.

In procuring a standard express train steam locomotive, the Deutsche Reichsbahn carried out a comparison between a superheated two-cylinder type (the DRG Class 01) and a four-cylinder compound locomotive (the Class 02). Ten examples of each type were built from 1925, and the Class 02 vehicles were given operating numbers 02 001 – 02 010. The first eight engines were manufactured in 1925 by the firm of Henschel, two more were built in 1926 by Maffei.

Because the Class 02 steam engines were badly designed, the compound engine could only produce a high level of power at speeds of over 70 km/h. In addition, below 100 PSi its steam consumption was higher than that of the Class 01.

Compared with the Class 01s, these engines had a complicated, and therefore maintenance-intensive, drive; as a result no more were ordered. From 1937 to 1942 the vehicles were successively converted to two-cylinder operation and regrouped as Class 01s with the new numbers 01 011 and 01 233 – 01 241. 

The first eight engines were equipped with  2'2' T 30 tenders; the other two with 2'2 T 32 tenders. Later on, the second tender was coupled to all of the first eight engines as well.

See also
 List of DRG locomotives and railbuses

Literature

External links 
 Photos of locomotive 02 003

02
4-6-2 locomotives
02
Henschel locomotives
Railway locomotives introduced in 1925
Compound locomotives
Maffei locomotives
Passenger locomotives
Standard gauge locomotives of Germany
2′C1′ h4v locomotives